Thelairaporia is a genus of parasitic flies in the family Tachinidae.

Distribution
Brazil

Species
 Thelairaporia brasiliensis Guimaraes, 1980
 Thelairaporia pollinosa Guimaraes, 1980

References

Diptera of South America
Dexiinae
Tachinidae genera